Mélissa Mayeux (born 2 November 1998) is a French shortstop for the University of Louisiana at Lafayette’s Ragin’ Cajuns softball team of the NCAA, and has represented France on the national softball and U18 baseball squads. She is the first female player to be eligible to sign with a major league team.

References

External links
  Melissa Mayeux discusses her future in baseball

French baseball players
Female baseball players
People from Louviers
Living people
1998 births
Sportspeople from Eure
Louisiana Ragin' Cajuns softball players
French sportswomen
21st-century French women